Airlink Cargo is a division of SA Airlink (Pty) Ltd and provides air freight transport services to over 35 destinations across Southern Africa from its base at O. R. Tambo International Airport. The division was formed in 2011 after one British Aerospace Jetstream 41 passenger aircraft belonging to parent company Airlink was converted for freight operations, followed the next year by a second aircraft. Freight is also carried on Airlink Cargo's behalf by Airlink and Swaziland Airlink across the region. Airlink Cargo is headquartered on the grounds of their hub near Johannesburg, South Africa.

History and services
The idea of an all-cargo airline service was proposed in early 2010 by the Airlink board and implemented in late 2011. Growing passenger demand at Airlink had resulted in insufficient space for cargo on board the airline's BAe Jetstream 41 aircraft. Passenger growth predictions forced the airline to convert two such aircraft for cargo operations only to satisfy demand for a quick and efficient regional air freight operation. A decision was also taken to convert all 16 of the airline's J41 aircraft for cargo operations after their retirement from passenger service, as a result of rapid growth in the regional freight market. The division offers transport services for general goods and services, live animals, dangerous goods, perishables and fragile, valuable and vulnerable cargo. They also offer customers an express service for transport within South Africa. All Airlink Cargo customers are able to track their shipment through the division's website.

Destinations
Airlink Cargo serves the following destinations as of February 2016, operated by Airlink and Swaziland Airlink:

 Gaborone – Sir Seretse Khama International Airport
 Kasane - Kasane Airport
 Maun - Maun Airport

 Maseru - Moshoeshoe I International Airport

 Antananarivo - Ivato International Airport
 Nosy Be - Fascene Airport

 Beira – Beira Airport
 Nampula - Nampula Airport
 Pemba - Pemba Airport
 Tete - Chingozi Airport
 Vilanculos - Vilankulo Airport

 Windhoek – Hosea Kutako International Airport
 Walvis Bay – Walvis Bay Airport

 Bloemfontein – Bloemfontein Airport
 Cape Town – Cape Town International Airport
 Durban – King Shaka International Airport
 East London – East London Airport
 George – George Airport
 Johannesburg – O.R. Tambo International Airport Hub
 Kimberley – Kimberley Airport
 Mthatha - Mthatha Airport
 Nelspruit - Kruger Mpumalanga International Airport
 Phalaborwa - Hendrik Van Eck Airport
 Pietermaritzburg - Pietermaritzburg Airport
 Polokwane - Polokwane International Airport
 Port Elizabeth – Port Elizabeth Airport
 Sishen - Sishen Airport
 Skukuza - Skukuza Airport
 Upington - Upington Airport

 Jamestown - St Helena Airport
 Georgetown - RAF Ascension Island

 Manzini - King Mswati III International Airport

 Livingstone - Harry Mwanga Nkumbula International Airport
 Lusaka – Kenneth Kaunda International Airport
 Ndola - Simon Mwansa Kapwepwe International Airport

 Bulawayo – Joshua Mqabuko Nkomo International Airport
 Harare – Harare International Airport
 Victoria Falls – Victoria Falls Airport

Fleet

Airlink and Swaziland Airlink carry cargo on board passenger flights for Airlink Cargo. 
Airlink operates a mix of 17 Embraer ERJ 135 aircraft, 11 Embraer ERJ 140, 3 Embraer 170 aircraft, 12 Embraer 190 aircraft, 4 BAe Jetstream 41 aircraft and 2 Cessna Grand Caravan aircraft. 
Swaziland Airlink operates 1 Embraer ERJ-135 aircraft.
Airlink Cargo destinations whilst utilizing the Cessna Caravans are: Maputo Mozambique, Gabarone Botswana and Maseru Lesotho. But destinations may vary depending on the requests from customers.

References

External links
Official website

Cargo airlines of South Africa
Companies based in Johannesburg
Airlines established in 2011
South African companies established in 2011